Associated Commercial Vehicles (ACV) was a holding company formed on 1 October 1948 when Associated Equipment Company purchased Crossley Motors and Maudslay Motor Company. In 1949 ACV took control of coachbuilding firm Park Royal Vehicles, along with its subsidiary Charles H. Roe, followed in 1961 by Thornycroft. In 1962, ACV was purchased by Leyland Motors

References

Associated Equipment Company
Holding companies of the United Kingdom
Holding companies established in 1948
Manufacturing companies disestablished in 1962
1948 establishments in England
1962 disestablishments in England
British companies disestablished in 1962
British companies established in 1948